The Soft Machine is the fifth studio album of Ozark Henry, the first of his albums to top the charts.

The track "These Days" was released as a single and reached the top 50 of the Ultratop charts, the first of his track releases to do so.

Track list
All songs written by Piet Goddaer

"These Days" – 3:32
"Christine" – 3:38
"We Were Never Alone" – 3:46
"Splinter" – 4:18
"Play Politics" – 3:28
"Weekenders" – 4:03
"Echo as Metaphor" – 2:50
"Cincinnati" – 3:54
"Morpheus" – 3:46
"Sun Dance" – 3:37
"Le Temps Qui Reste" – 3:37
"Jailbird" – 3:56

Charts

Weekly charts

Year-end charts

References

Ozark Henry albums
2006 albums